Hard music is most commonly associated with the hard rock genre, but it may also refer to any number of subgenres with hard in the name, most of which have no connection to hard rock. These are:

Hard bop
Hard dance
Hard NRG
Hard trance
Hardbag
Hardbass
Hardstyle
UK hard house
Hard bounce
UK hardcore
Hard funk
Hard pop (disambiguation)
Hardcore (EDM)
Breakbeat hardcore
Digital hardcore
Happy hardcore
Hard techno
Hardcore breaks
Industrial hardcore
Mainstream hardcore
UK hardcore
Hardcore punk
Beatdown hardcore
Christian hardcore
Digital hardcore
Japanese hardcore
Heavy hardcore
Horror hardcore
Melodic hardcore
New York hardcore
Positive hardcore
Washington D.C. hardcore
Hardvapour
Hardwave
Post-hardcore

Notes